Fight for Nanjing, Shanghai and Hangzhou, also known as Great Battle in Ning Hu Hang, is a 1999 Chinese epic war film directed by He Xiaojiang and Shi Wei and written by Lu Zhuguo, and starring Gu Yue, Sun Feihu, Liu Xitian, Xie Weicai, Sun Weimin, and Lu Qi. The film premiered in China in 1999. The film is about the war between the Communist troops and the Kuomintang troops in east China during the Chinese Civil War.

Plot
In April 1949, after the three major campaigns (Liaoshen Campaign, Huaihai Campaign and Pingjin Campaign), Mao Zedong and Zhu De orders the Communist army to march into the east China. Nanjing, the capital of Republic of China (1912-1949) is occupied by the Communist Party of China. Then Hangzhou comes under Communists sovereign. On May 27, Shanghai is controlled by the Communist troops. The Kuomintang troops are defeated and flee in disorder.

Cast

Main
 Gu Yue as Mao Zedong 
 Sun Feihu as Chiang Kai-shek
 Liu Xitian as Chen Yi
 Xie Weicai as Su Yu
 Sun Weimin as Zhou Enlai
 Lu Qi as Deng Xiaoping

Supporting
 Fu Xuecheng as Liu Bocheng
 Xiao Xiong as Soong May-ling
 Yu Zhong as Tan Zhenlin
 Jiang Changyi as Zhang Zhen
 Xu Guangming as Gu Zhutong
 Ye Qingling as Tang Enbo
 Lu Xuegong as Chen Yi
 Wang Wufu as Zhu De
 Guo Fazeng as Liu Shaoqi
 Wang Jian as Ren Bishi
 He Yongsheng as Wei Guoqing
 Wang Yilun as Chen Xilian
 Cao Peichang as Liu Changyi

Release
Fight for Nanjing, Shanghai and Hangzhou was released in China in 1999.

Accolades

References

External links
 
 

1999 films
Chinese historical films
Chinese war films
Chinese epic films
Films set in Zhejiang
Films set in Shanghai
Films set in Jiangsu
Films shot in Zhejiang
Films set in the 1940s
Cultural depictions of Chiang Kai-shek
Cultural depictions of Mao Zedong
Cultural depictions of Zhou Enlai
Cultural depictions of Deng Xiaoping
1990s historical films
1990s war films